The Paraguay national badminton team represents Paraguay in international badminton team competitions. The national team is controlled and organized by the Paraguay Badminton Federation. Paraguay debuted in team badminton at the 2022 South American Games when it was granted qualification as host nation.

Participation in South American Games 
The Paraguayan team debuted in the 2022 South American Games mixed team event. The team was placed in Group A but lost in the group stages.

Current squad 
The following players have been selected to represent Paraguay at the 2022 South American Games.

Men     
Alejandro Ávalos
Josias Haneman
Julio González
Leo Lee

Women
Dahiana Álvarez
Ana Amarilla
Cecilia Haneman

References 

Badminton
National badminton teams